Fallen Empires is the sixth studio album by Northern Irish-Scottish rock band Snow Patrol. The album was released on 11 November 2011 (10 January 2012 in North America). The album became the first to feature future member Johnny McDaid, who was credited as guest musician and songwriter in the album liner notes, and would officially join the band following the tour. It is also the last album to feature keyboardist Tom Simpson, who would later depart the band in 2013. American singer Lissie provided additional vocals for six songs on the album ("I'll Never Let Go", "The Weight of Love", "The Garden Rules", "Fallen Empires", "Berlin", and "Those Distant Bells").

Background and development
When asked about the writing process for the album, Gary Lightbody commented by saying "It's the longest album we've ever made by far but also the best. We took our time and I also had some bouts of writer's block. It's the first time it's happened for such a long time. I've had days when I haven't been able to write. Since 2009, I've gone through three writer's blocks but I'm glad because the results are great afterwards. They probably made me write better songs." Snow Patrol planned a "Fallen Empires tour" in 2012 with the first date being at the O2 in Dublin. The song "New York" can be heard at the end of "Suddenly" (Season 8 Episode 10) of Grey's Anatomy.
The song is also played in "After School Special" (Season 4 Episode 10) of The Vampire Diaries.

Singles
 "Called Out in the Dark" was released as the first single from the album on 2 September 2011 in the UK as an EP. A video was released for the song before its release date on 17 August 2011.
 "This Isn't Everything You Are" was announced as the second single from the album on Snow Patrol's official site. It was released on 14 October 2011.
 "New York" was the third single from the album released in America on 20 December 2011.
 "In the End" was released as the fourth single on 13 February.
 "Lifening" was the fifth single and was released on 5 July.

Reception

Critical reception 

Fallen Empires received mixed reviews from critics. According to the website Metacritic, which assigns a weighted mean rating out of 100 to reviews from mainstream critics, the album received an average review score of 58/100, based on 25 reviews, which indicates "mixed or average reviews".

James Christopher Monger wrote a favorable review for Allmusic, stating that the album "establishes an expansive vista of sound early on, bathing fairly simple melodies in waves of fastidious loops and sparse percussion." Mike Haydock wrote a positive review for BBC Music, analysing that "Best of all are the moments when Snow Patrol blend the two approaches together, combining their own aesthetic with an Achtung Baby adoration." Entertainment Weeklys Melissa Maerz wrote that "For all the sentiment, it's the simplest stuff that rings true." The New York Timess Nate Chinen praised the songwriting, saying that "What makes this all feel reasonably unforced is the abiding earnestness in the songwriting." The A.V. Club wrote that the album "it's comforting at worst and occasionally fantastic."

Dave Simpson wrote an average review, saying that "Although the variation in styles doesn't make for the most cohesive album, the default mood is still downbeat but anthemic--songs for couples to cling tightly to one another while raising mobiles in the air." While Now Magazine found out that "In the first few songs they stretch themselves creatively and come up with promising results, but halfway through it's back to overwrought ballads and middle-of-the-road mid-tempo rock songs." A mixed review came from Rolling Stones Stacey Anderson, who wrote that "Snow Patrol fall back to the blandly inoffensive safe zone--though at least they sound a little brighter." Pitchfork Media thought that "the results are goofy." The Daily Telegraph criticized the album for "stick[ing] too rigidly to the formula."

Commercial performance
In 2011, Fallen Empires sold 269,000 copies in the UK. The album debuted at number five on the US Billboard 200 chart, selling 31,000 copies. It became the band's highest debut on the Billboard chart and the second album to reach the top-ten.

Track listing

There was also a special digipak version of the album showing highlights of the band playing live at the Royal Albert Hall on 25 November 2009 on their 'Reworked' tour. The track listing is as follows:

First half highlights:

Second half highlights:

 Personnel Snow PatrolGary Lightbody – vocals, guitar, backing vocals
Nathan Connolly – guitar, backing vocals
Paul Wilson – bass guitar, backing vocals
Jonny Quinn – drums, percussion
Tom Simpson – keyboards, samples
Johnny McDaid - piano, guitarOther personnel'

 James "Big Jim" Anderson – tuba
 Stephen Wick – tuba
 John Barclay – trumpet
 Guy Barker – trumpet
 Pat White – trumpet
 Richard Bayliss – horns
 Evgeny Chebykin – horns
 Jocelyn Lightfoot – horns
 Timothy Brown – horns
 Kira Doherty – horns
 Philip Eastop – horns

 Avshalom Caspi – brass arrangement
 Ian Fasham – bass trombone
 David A. Stewart – bass trombone
 Dan Jenkins – trombone
 Colin Sheen – trombone
 Sam Bell – engineer, editing
 Tom McFall – engineer
 Philip Rose – engineer
 Tilmann Ilse – assistant engineer
 Karen Kelleher – assistant engineer
 Owen Lewis – assistant engineer

 James Jarvis – choir director
 John Ross – photography
 John C.F. Davis – mastering
 Hilary Skewes – contractor
 Cenzo Townshend – mixing
 Neil Comber – mixing assistant
 Dave Emery – mixing assistant
 Jacknife Lee – guitar, keyboards, programming, producer, glass harmonica, mixing
 Lissie – vocals

Charts and certifications

Weekly charts

Year-end charts

Certifications

References

2011 albums
Fiction Records albums
Interscope Records albums
Snow Patrol albums
Albums produced by Jacknife Lee